Thaciano Mickael da Silva (born 12 May 1995), simply known as Thaciano, is a Brazilian footballer who plays for Brazilian club Grêmio. Mainly an attacking midfielder, he can also play as a defensive midfielder.

Club career
Born in Campina Grande, Paraíba, Thaciano was a Porto de Caruaru youth graduate. Promoted to the first team in 2013, he made his senior debut on 20 January of that year by starting in a 0–4 Campeonato Pernambucano home loss against Central.

Thaciano was an undisputed for Porto during the 2014 campaign, as his side achieved a place in Série D. On 13 January 2015, after fully recovering from an injury, he joined Série B side Boa Esporte on loan until the end of the year.

Thaciano made his professional debut on 1 September 2015, coming on as a late substitute in a 1–2 home loss against Paraná. He scored his first goal on 16 October, netting the second in a 2–2 home draw against Sampaio Corrêa. He contributed with 11 appearances, scoring four goals, as his side suffered relegation.

On 9 May 2016, after already being bought outright by Boa, Thaciano was loaned to Santos for one year. The following January, after appearing with the B-team in the Copa Paulista, he was promoted to the first team by manager Dorival Júnior.

On 29 June 2017, Thaciano returned to his parent club after an agreement between Santos and Boa Esporte was not reached; he only represented the main squad once, in a friendly against KAC Kénitra. On 16 July, he scored a brace for Boa in a 2–2 away draw against Londrina.

On 29 November 2017, after scoring a career-best ten goals, Thaciano agreed to a two-year loan deal with Grêmio, with a buyout clause. On 7 May 2019, he was bought outright by the club for a fee of R$ 2 million for 80% of his federative rights, and signed a three-year contract.

Career statistics

Honours
Grêmio
Recopa Sudamericana: 2018
Campeonato Gaúcho: 2018, 2019

References

External links
Santos FC profile 

1995 births
Living people
Sportspeople from Paraíba
Brazilian footballers
Association football midfielders
Campeonato Brasileiro Série A players
Campeonato Brasileiro Série B players
Campeonato Brasileiro Série D players
Clube Atlético do Porto players
Boa Esporte Clube players
Santos FC players
Grêmio Foot-Ball Porto Alegrense players
Esporte Clube Bahia players
Altay S.K. footballers
Süper Lig players
Brazilian expatriate footballers
Brazilian expatriate sportspeople in Turkey
Expatriate footballers in Turkey